Aletta Jorritsma (born 17 May 1989) is a Dutch rower. She competed in the women's coxless pair event at the 2016 Summer Olympics.

References

External links
 

1989 births
Living people
Dutch female rowers
Olympic rowers of the Netherlands
Rowers at the 2016 Summer Olympics
Place of birth missing (living people)
21st-century Dutch women